Kenneth Leonard "Ki-Jana" Carter (born September 12, 1973) is a former American football running back who played in the National Football League (NFL) for eight seasons. He played college football at Penn State, where he earned consensus All-American honors and was MVP of the 1995 Rose Bowl. Carter was selected first overall in the 1995 NFL Draft by the Cincinnati Bengals, but after suffering a knee tear during his first preseason game, he struggled with injuries for the remainder of his career. Missing most of his five seasons with the Bengals due to injury, Carter played his final three seasons in a limited role for the Washington Redskins and New Orleans Saints.

Early years
Carter was born in Westerville, Ohio.  His nickname, "Ki-Jana", is from a character in the movie Shaft in Africa and he has gone by that name since his birth. At Westerville South High School, he starred in football, basketball, and track.  In football, he was a 1991 Parade magazine high school All-American.

College career
Carter attended Pennsylvania State University, where he was a standout player for coach Joe Paterno's Penn State Nittany Lions football team from 1992 to 1994, along with a strong group of offensive players including future NFL starters Jeff Hartings, Joe Jurevicius, Kerry Collins, O.J. McDuffie, Bobby Engram and Kyle Brady. Together, this explosive offense propelled the 1994 Penn State team to a 12–0 undefeated season. At Penn State Carter wore the number 32, which had been worn by running back Blair Thomas. Despite playing only three seasons, he is still in the top ten among Penn State running backs, having compiled 2,829 yards rushing on 395 attempts and scoring 34 touchdowns. His best single game came against the Michigan State Spartans in 1994, when he rushed for 227 yards on 27 carries and scored five touchdowns. Carter helped lead the 1994 Penn State football team to an undefeated record and a berth in the Rose Bowl, was recognized as a consensus first-team All-American, and finished second in the Heisman Trophy voting. He earned co-MVP honors in the Rose Bowl, rushing for 156 yards and three touchdowns on 21 carries. He ran for an 83-yard touchdown on the first offensive play of the game, which is the third-longest run in Rose Bowl history and the longest run in Penn State bowl history. Carter also added touchdown runs of 17 and three yards in the third quarter. The Rose Bowl was Carter's final game as a Nittany Lion, as he was encouraged by Paterno to forgo his senior season and enter the NFL Draft. "This is the first time I have told anybody who has not graduated that I felt they ought to leave," Paterno said. The Tournament of Roses Association announced his induction into the Rose Bowl Hall of Fame as a member of the Class of 2014, a ceremony that took place in December 2014.

Professional career

They acquired the first pick in a trade with the expansion Carolina Panthers.

Carter signed a seven-year, $19.2 million deal which included a $7.125 million signing bonus, which at the time was an NFL record contract for a rookie.  There were also incentive clauses such as making an extra $100,000 if he scored 12 touchdowns in a season.

He played for the Washington Redskins in 2001. In 2002, Carter was signed by the Green Bay Packers, but did not make their final roster. He spent his final two seasons with the New Orleans Saints from 2003 to 2004. In seven NFL seasons, he played in 59 games, started 14 of them, and compiled 1,144 rushing yards and 20 touchdowns on 319 attempts, and 66 receptions for 469 yards and a touchdown.

Injuries 
Often considered a "bust" by media given where he was drafted, Carter was beset with injuries from his rookie season on.

Carter tore a ligament in his knee on his third carry of his first preseason game of his rookie year and never fully recovered.  He missed the entire 1995 season.

In 1997, he suffered a torn rotator cuff in his left shoulder with fears that he would miss the entire season.

In 1998, he missed the entire season after breaking his left wrist in a game against the Tennessee Oilers.

In 1999, he again missed the entire season after dislocating his right kneecap in a game against the Carolina Panthers.

Life after football
Carter is now an entrepreneur and sports blogger at OPENSports.com. He founded Byoglobe, a print and promotional marketing material company, in 2008. He serves as the Sunrise, Florida-based company's chief executive officer.

References

External links
"Carter won't wallow" Bengals.com, April 27, 2007
Ki-Jana Carter blog entries, OPEN Sports Network
Byoglobe website

1973 births
Living people
African-American players of American football
All-American college football players
American bloggers
American health care chief executives
American football running backs
Cincinnati Bengals players
National Football League first-overall draft picks
New Orleans Saints players
Penn State Nittany Lions football players
People from Westerville, Ohio
Players of American football from Ohio
Washington Redskins players
21st-century African-American writers
20th-century African-American sportspeople
Ed Block Courage Award recipients